Transmitter Koszęcin is a facility for mediumwave and FM broadcasting near Koszecin, Poland (Geographical Coordinates: 50°39'14"N   18°51'25"E ). It was opened in 1977. It has two guyed masts: the first one is 110 metres high, is grounded, and carries antennas for FM broadcasting (Radio Maryja on 107.0 MHz ERP, 5.00 kW, polarization V); the second is 138m high. That second mast is insulated from ground and used for mediumwave transmission; broadcasting of the Radio Pahonia in Belarusian is planned on 1080 kHz with ERP 350 kW using this mast. The signal will cover the whole of Europe including the Ural Mountains. Earlier, the AM Mast was used for Polish Radio and used two Tesla transmitters 750 kW each in parallel. With the transmitted power of 1500 kW it was one of the most powerful mediumwave transmitters in the world.

See also
 List of masts

References

External links
 http://www.ukf.pl/index.php?topic=76.0
 http://new.radiopolska.pl/forum/index.php?showtopic=1762
 http://www.skyscraperpage.com/diagrams/?b46548
 http://www.skyscraperpage.com/diagrams/?b46549
 
 
 http://radiopolska.pl/wykaz/pokaz_lokalizacja.php?pid=8
 https://maps.google.com/maps?ie=UTF8&om=1&z=14&ll=50.651801,18.866959&spn=0.024162,0.058537&t=h

Radio masts and towers in Poland
Lubliniec County
Buildings and structures in Silesian Voivodeship
1977 establishments in Poland
Towers completed in 1977